The 1968 Michigan State Spartans football team represented Michigan State University in the 1968 Big Ten Conference football season. In their 15th season under head coach Duffy Daugherty, the Spartans compiled a 5–5 overall record (2–5 against Big Ten opponents) and finished in seventh place in the Big Ten Conference.

Three Spartans were selected for the 1968 All-Big Ten Conference football teams. Defensive back Al Brenner was selected as a first-team player by both the Associated Press (AP) and the United Press International (UPI). Tackle Charles Bailey received first-team honors from the AP, and linebacker Rich Saul received second-team honors from both the AP and UPI.

Schedule

Personnel
 DT No. 61 Charles Bailey, Sr.

Game summaries

Michigan

On October 12, 1968, Michigan State lost to Michigan by a 28 to 14 score. The game was the 61st meeting in the Michigan–Michigan State football rivalry. The Spartans had won three consecutive games from 1965 to 1967, and the Wolverines came into the 1968 game as an unranked underdog facing an undefeated Spartans team that had routed Wisconsin 39-0 the prior week and was ranked #12 in the AP Poll.

Michigan quarterback Dennis Brown completed 9 of 15 passes for 177 yards and two touchdowns. Jim Mandich caught four passes for 125 yards, including a 53-yard touchdown reception, and John Gabler also caught a touchdown pass. Ron Johnson carried the ball 19 times for 152 yards and a touchdown. Fullback Garvie Craw also ran 25 yards for a touchdown and caught a pass from Brown for a two-point conversion. Tim Killian also kicked two extra points for Michigan. Michigan gained 420 yards in the game, 243 rushing and 177 passing. Michigan State gained 356 yards, 295 rushing and 61 passing.

After defeating Michigan State, the Wolverines were ranked No. 17 in the weekly AP Poll. It was the first time since early in the 1966 season that Michigan had been ranked.

References

Michigan State
Michigan State Spartans football seasons
Michigan State Spartans football